is a passenger railway station located in the town of Ōtoyo, Nagaoka District, Kōchi Prefecture, Japan. It is operated by JR Shikoku and has the station number "D33".

Lines

Layout
The station, which is unmanned, consists of a narrow island platform serving two tracks all mounted on an iron bridge spanning the Ananai River. From both the north and south ends of the bridge, stairs lead up to a pedestrian walkway along the length of the bridge which gives access to the platform. At an intermediate landing up the steps on the south side, a waiting room has been established.

Adjacent stations

History
The station opened on 1 October 1960 on the existing Dosan Line but at a different location further to the south. After track re-alignment works, the station was moved to its present location on 3 March 1986. At this time the station was operated by Japanese Government Railways, later becoming Japanese National Railways (JNR). With the privatization of JNR on 1 April 1987, control of the station passed to JR Shikoku.

Surrounding area
Japan National Route 32

See also
 List of Railway Stations in Japan

References

External links

JR Shikoku timetable 

Railway stations in Kōchi Prefecture
Railway stations in Japan opened in 1960
Ōtoyo, Kōchi